Seager is a surname. Notable people with the surname include:

Jasper Seagar (died 1721), pirate active in the Indian Ocean
Jo Seagar (born 1955), New Zealand writer, TV personality, and celebrity cook
Edward Seagar (1904–1983), Anglican priest
George Seagar (1888–1968), New Zealand rugby league player

See also
 Seager
 Seeger
 Seger